Yaniv Ben-Nissan (born August 22, 1983) is an Israeli professional football player.

He was capped by his country at under-16 and under-19 level.

References

1983 births
Living people
Israeli Jews
Israeli footballers
F.C. Ashdod players
Hapoel Tel Aviv F.C. players
Hapoel Jerusalem F.C. players
Bnei Sakhnin F.C. players
Israeli Premier League players
Liga Leumit players
Israeli expatriate sportspeople in Sweden
Association football defenders